Almutawakel (foaled in 1995 in Great Britain, died in 2007) was a British thoroughbred racehorse sired by Machiavellian and the Irish stakes-winning Green Desert mare, Elfaslah.

Racing career
Almutawakel's most prominent victory came in the 1999 Dubai World Cup. Going into the race at 44-1 and considered a heavy underdog, Almutawakel held his own and, with jockey Richard Hills at the helm, won the race by ¾ lengths. He beat out several prominent horses, such as Malek, Silver Charm, Daylami and Victory Gallop, winning the $3 million first place prize in the process. At the time, it was the first Dubai World Cup win for Sheikh Hamdan, who has since produced another winner, Invasor.  He was also the first of seven wins at the Dubai World Cup for Godolphin Racing.

Prior to winning the Dubai World Cup, Almutawakel won the 1998 Prix Jean Prat at Chantilly. He also finished as the runner up in the 1998 Grand Prix de Paris. Almutawakel finished his racing career in the United States.  In 2000, trained by Mark Hennig, he finished second in the Woodward Stakes and the Oaklawn Handicap and third in the Jockey Club Gold Cup. Almutawakel did not win a race after his first-place finish at the 1999 Dubai World Cup.

Stud career
Almutawakel finished his career with a 4-4-1 in 19 career starts.  Overall, he accumulated $3,643,021 in earnings.  In 2007, after failing to respond to treatment for chronic arthritis, Almutawakel was euthanized in Ireland at Sheikh Hamdan's Derrinstown Stud.  At the time his death, Almutawakel sired eight stakes winners for a grand total of $5,765,852 in earnings.

Pedigree

References

1995 racehorse births
2007 racehorse deaths
Racehorses bred in the United Kingdom
Racehorses trained in the United Kingdom
Dubai World Cup winners
Racehorses trained in the United Arab Emirates
Thoroughbred family 16-g